Crestview (also Crest View) is an unincorporated community in Mono County, California.

A resort named Crestview Lodge was founded at the place in 1927 by Clarence Wilson.

References

Unincorporated communities in California
Unincorporated communities in Mono County, California